In linear algebra, the adjugate or classical adjoint of a square matrix  is the transpose of its cofactor matrix and is denoted by . It is also occasionally known as adjunct matrix, or "adjoint", though the latter term today normally refers to a different concept, the adjoint operator which for a matrix is the conjugate transpose.

The product of a matrix with its adjugate gives a diagonal matrix (entries not on the main diagonal are zero) whose diagonal entries are the determinant of the original matrix:

Consequently, the multiplicative inverse of an invertible matrix can be found by dividing its adjugate by its determinant.

Definition 

Important consequence 
That is,

where  is the  identity matrix.  This is a consequence of the Laplace expansion of the determinant.

When this holds, the equation above yields

Examples

1 × 1 generic matrix 
Observe that

2 × 2 generic matrix 
The adjugate of the 2 × 2 matrix

is

By direct computation,

In this case, it is also true that ((A)) = (A) and hence that ((A)) = A.

3 × 3 generic matrix 
Consider a 3 × 3 matrix

Its cofactor matrix is

where

Its adjugate is the transpose of its cofactor matrix,

3 × 3 numeric matrix 
As a specific example, we have

It is easy to check the adjugate is the inverse times the determinant, .

The  in the second row, third column of the adjugate was computed as follows.  The (2,3) entry of the adjugate is the (3,2) cofactor of A.  This cofactor is computed using the submatrix obtained by deleting the third row and second column of the original matrix A,

The (3,2) cofactor is a sign times the determinant of this submatrix:

and this is the (2,3) entry of the adjugate.

Properties 
For any  matrix , elementary computations show that adjugates have the following properties:
 , where  is the identity matrix.
 , where  is the zero matrix, except that if  then .
  for any scalar .
 .
 .
 If  is invertible, then .  It follows that:
  is invertible with inverse .
 .

Over the complex numbers,
 , where the bar denotes complex conjugation.
 , where the asterisk denotes conjugate transpose.

Suppose that  is another  matrix.  Then

This can be proved in three ways. One way, valid for any commutative ring, is a direct computation using the Cauchy–Binet formula.

A corollary of the previous formula is that, for any non-negative integer ,

If  is invertible, then the above formula also holds for negative .

From the identity

we deduce

Multiplying the identity  on the left and right by  proves that

Over the real or complex numbers, continuity implies that  commutes with  even when  is not invertible.

Finally, there is a more general proof than the second proof, which only requires that an n × n matrix has entries over a field with at least 2n + 1 elements (e.g. a 5 × 5 matrix over the integers modulo 11).  is a polynomial in t with degree at most n, so it has at most n roots. These two polynomials at the ij&hairsp;th entry agree on at least n + 1 points, as we have at least n + 1 elements of the field where  is invertible, and we have proven the identity for invertible matrices. Polynomials of degree n which agree on n + 1 points must be identical (subtract them from each other and you have n + 1 roots for a polynomial of degree at most n – a contradiction unless their difference is identically zero). As the two polynomials are identical, they take the same value for every value of t. Thus, they take the same value when t = 0. 

Using the above properties and other elementary computations, it is straightforward to show that if  has one of the following properties, then  does as well:
 Upper triangular,
 Lower triangular,
 Diagonal,
 Orthogonal,
 Unitary,
 Symmetric,
 Hermitian,
 Skew-symmetric,
 Skew-Hermitian,
 Normal.

When  is not invertible, the adjugate satisfies different but closely related formulas.
 If , then .
 If , then .

Column substitution and Cramer's rule 

Partition  into column vectors:

Let  be a column vector of size .

Laplace expand the determinant of this matrix along column .  The result is entry  of the product .  Collecting these determinants for the different possible  yields an equality of column vectors

This formula has the following concrete consequence.  Consider the linear system of equations

Assume that  is non-singular.

Applying the previous formula to this situation yields Cramer's rule,

Characteristic polynomial 
Let the characteristic polynomial of  be

Multiply  by its adjugate.  Since  by the Cayley–Hamilton theorem, some elementary manipulations reveal

and by the above formula, this is equal to

Jacobi's formula 

The adjugate also appears in Jacobi's formula for the derivative of the determinant.  If  is continuously differentiable, then

It follows that the total derivative of the determinant is the transpose of the adjugate:

Cayley–Hamilton formula 

The Cayley–Hamilton theorem states that

These coefficients can be explicitly represented in terms of traces of powers of  using complete exponential Bell polynomials. The resulting formula is

For the 2 × 2 case, this gives

For the 3 × 3 case, this gives

For the 4 × 4 case, this gives

Relation to exterior algebras 
The adjugate can be viewed in abstract terms using exterior algebras.  Let  be an -dimensional vector space.  The exterior product defines a bilinear pairing

Therefore, it yields an isomorphism

Suppose that  is a linear transformation. Pullback by the st exterior power of  induces a morphism of  spaces.

To see why, give  the basis

The image of  under  is determined by where it sends basis vectors:

Each of these terms maps to zero under  except the  term.

that is, it equals

If  is endowed with an inner product and a volume form, then the map  can be decomposed further.  In this case,  can be understood as the composite of the Hodge star operator and dualization.  Specifically, if  is the volume form, then it, together with the inner product, determines an isomorphism

This induces an isomorphism

A vector  in  corresponds to the linear functional

That is,  equals .

Higher adjugates 
Let  be an  matrix, and fix .

Basic properties of higher adjugates include:
 .
 .
 .
 .
 , where  denotes the &hairsp;th compound matrix.

Iterated adjugates 
Iteratively taking the adjugate of an invertible matrix A  times yields

For example,

See also 
 Cayley–Hamilton theorem
 Cramer's rule
 Trace diagram
 Jacobi's formula
 Faddeev–LeVerrier algorithm
 Compound matrix

References

Bibliography 

  Roger A. Horn and Charles R. Johnson (2013), Matrix Analysis, Second Edition. Cambridge University Press, 
  Roger A. Horn and Charles R. Johnson (1991), Topics in Matrix Analysis. Cambridge University Press,

External links 
 Matrix Reference Manual
Online matrix calculator (determinant, track, inverse, adjoint, transpose) Compute Adjugate matrix up to order 8
 

Matrix theory
Linear algebra